Francis Trevelyan Miller (1877–1959) was an American writer and filmmaker.

He is known for his books about exploration, travel and photography.  He wrote many books about the American Civil War, including The Photographic History of the Civil War, in Ten Volumes (New York: The Review of Reviews Co., 1912).  He also wrote History of WWII: Armed Services Memorial Edition.

He made several feature films and wrote the screenplay for the 1919 film Deliverance, about Helen Keller. In 1955 his photograph of children at a Chicago funfair was selected by Edward Steichen for MoMA's world-touring The Family of Man exhibition.

External links
 
 
 Books by Francis Trevelyan Miller at Library Thing

1877 births
1959 deaths
American film directors
American male writers